Bamboula, Op. 2, is a fantasy composition for piano written by American composer Louis Moreau Gottschalk during a delirium of typhoid fever in the French town of Clermont-sur-l'Oise in the summer of 1848. Dedicated "à sa Majesté Isabelle II, Reine des Espagnes", it is the first of the so-called set of four "Louisiana Creole pieces" that Gottschalk composed between 1848 and 1851.

Musical analysis
According to the Dictionary of the English/Creole of Trinidad & Tobago, the term "bamboula" is referring to "a kind of vigorous African-based dance with singing and drumming", possibly from the Southern Kikongo (Congo) language, where it means "a word which transfers the force of external things into oneself; and in Joola language "bombolong," "war dance" (Eastern Kikongo: "ignite").
.<ref>See the "bamboula" etymology in the Dictionary of the English/Creole of Trinidad & Tobago': https://books.google.fr/books?id=_n82hsbDJBMC&pg=PA46&lpg=PA46&dq=baboule+kikongo&source=bl&ots=zpO1a58CEe&sig=ACfU3U1N11yFIi-qSwjGli5TdeCX3ezfBg&hl=en&sa=X&ved=2ahUKEwj0kLT02fvuAhWSyYUKHfkXC00Q6AEwAHoECAcQAw#v=onepage&q=baboulekikongo&f=false</ref>

An early 1950 Haitian voodoo ritual recording by Harold Courlander, "Baboule Dance (three drums)," shows a traditional rhythmic drum pattern very similar to the specific rhythm found on Gottschalk's Bamboula piece. It is evidence that the bamboula was an old dance based on a particular rhythm heard by Gottschalk in his youth; Many African Americans in New Orleans had come from Haiti and reference to the term "bamboula" and this rhythm can be found in various Caribbean islands.

A 1954 biguine-style recording, "Bamboula," made in April 1954 (with added lyrics in creole French) by Abel Beauregard Et l'Orchestre Créole Matou from Guadeloupe is a cover version based on the Gottschalk composition.

Based on two Creole melodies, Musieu Bainjo and Quan' patate la cuite, the Gottschalk composition was published with the subtitle of Danse des nègres'' at the Bureau Central de Musique on 22 April 1849 by the Paris publisher 'Escudiers', with many unauthorized copies being issued in Europe shortly thereafter. Its first concert performance occurred on the evening of Tuesday 17 April 1849 at the Salle Pleyel during Gottschalk's second appearance as a professional pianist.

The composition, written in the key of D-flat major, with a strongly rhythmically marked melody, is organized in three sections (A-A-B). The introduction begins with a concluding gesture in the bass range, mimicking a drum beat. The second is a transposition of the first theme, while the third is underlined by a heavily syncopated melody in the relative minor (B-flat minor). With a duple  time signature and an Allegro tempo marking, the composition features many shifting moods and virtuosic passages.

References

External links

Bamboula, Op. 2 - Louis Moreau Gottschalk on YouTube

Compositions for solo piano
1845 compositions
Compositions by Louis Moreau Gottschalk
Piano compositions by American composers
Piano compositions in the Romantic era
Compositions in D-flat major